

List of presidents of the Jamaican Council
Source:

List of presidents of the Legislative Council of Jamaica

Source:

This position was succeeded by the President of the Senate of Jamaica.

Footnote and references

Politics of Jamaica
Jamaica, Presidents Of The Legislative Council